Entre-Vignes is a commune in the Hérault department in the Occitanie region in southern France. It was established on 1 January 2019 by merger of the former communes of Saint-Christol (the seat) and Vérargues.

Population

See also
Communes of the Hérault department

References

Communes of Hérault